The Sri Lanka national cricket team toured England from 13 May to 24 June 2014 for a Twenty20 International (T20I), five One Day Internationals (ODIs) and two Test matches against the England cricket team. They also played three one-day and one four-day tour matches against English county sides, as well as preceding the entire tour with a two-match ODI series against Ireland. Sri Lanka won the Test series 1–0 (the first time they had won a Test series with more than one match in England), the ODI series 3–2 and the one-off T20I.

Squads

Tour matches

List A: Essex vs Sri Lankans

List A: Kent vs Sri Lankans

Twenty20: Sussex vs Sri Lankans

First-class: Northamptonshire vs Sri Lankans

T20I series

Only T20I

ODI series

1st ODI

2nd ODI

3rd ODI

4th ODI

5th ODI

Test series

1st Test

2nd Test

Mankading incident
In the fifth ODI game, England batsman Jos Buttler was controversially run out backing-up at the non-striker's end by Sri Lankan bowler Sachithra Senanayake, a dismissal called Mankading. Senanayake had warned Buttler twice before in the same game about moving out of his crease, before he removed his bails and appealed to umpire Michael Gough. Speaking after the game, Sri Lankan captain Angelo Mathews defended the decision by saying "what we did was completely within the rules." England coach Peter Moores said he was "disappointed" in Mathew's decision. Former England captain Michael Vaughan said it was "no way to play the game", but another former captain, Michael Atherton, defended the decision saying "You see a lot of batsmen wandering aimlessly out of their ground. It's a good lesson for him – don't be dozy and keep your bat in your crease". Australian captain Michael Clarke said that "I think as long as the player's warned, it's in the rules so you can make whatever decision you want". Buttler's dismissal by Senanayake was the first instance of Mankading in international cricket since Peter Kirsten's innings was ended by Kapil Dev during an ODI between South Africa and India in 1992.

References

External links
Series home at ESPNcricinfo

2014 in English cricket
2014
International cricket competitions in 2014